Juan Miguel Basulto Medina (born 7 January 1992) is a Mexican professional footballer that plays as a centre-back for Liga FPD club Herediano.

Club career

Youth
Basulto joined Guadalajara's youth academy in 2008. Playing in the Chivas Youth Academy going through U-17 and U-20. Until finally reaching the first team, Benjamín Galindo being the coach promoting Basulto to first team.

Guadalajara
Basulto made his official debut under Mexican coach Benjamín Galindo in the Liga MX which was on January 11, 2013. He started with the first team against Santos Laguna which ended in a 2–0 defeat.

Honours
Guadalajara
Liga MX: Clausura 2017
Copa MX: Apertura 2015, Clausura 2017
Supercopa MX: 2016
CONCACAF Champions League: 2018

Herediano
Liga FPD: Apertura 2021

References

External links
 
 

1992 births
Living people
Footballers from Jalisco
People from Ocotlán, Jalisco
Mexico youth international footballers
C.D. Guadalajara footballers
Leones Negros UdeG footballers
Coras de Nayarit F.C. footballers
Club Atlético Zacatepec players
Liga MX players
Ascenso MX players
Association football defenders
Mexican footballers